Anundsjö parish is a parish in the Diocese of Härnösand in Sweden.

History
The Anundsjö church is located in the community of Bredbyn in Örnsköldsvik Municipality and has a detached belltower.

Notable inhabitants
Eilert Pilarm, Elvis impersonator
Peter Artedi or Petrus Arctaedius (1705–1735), naturalist
Frideborg Winblad, educator and administrator

External links
Website

References

Ångermanland
Västernorrland County
Diocese of Härnösand
Parishes of the Church of Sweden